Percy Hattersley-Smith (19 May 1847 – 19 January 1918) was an English cricketer. He played for Gloucestershire between 1878 and 1879.

References

1847 births
1918 deaths
Cricketers from Cambridgeshire
English cricketers
Gloucestershire cricketers
Sportspeople from Cambridge
Cambridgeshire cricketers